`Awqad or Al-Awqadain is an area within the city of Salalah in Dhofar Governorate,  in southwestern Oman.

References

Populated places in the Dhofar Governorate